Ermoclia is a village in Ștefan Vodă District, Moldova.

Notable natives
 Ion Ciontoloi

References

Villages of Ștefan Vodă District
Akkermansky Uyezd